JOPA may refer to:
 Journal of Physics A, a scientific journal published by the Institute of Physics
 "JoPa", nickname of Joe Paterno, college football coach
 Junior Officer Protective (or Protection) Association, an informal organization of lower ranking US Navy officers - see for example Second VA-65 (U.S. Navy)#Desert Storm